Anthia costata is a species of ground beetle in the subfamily Anthiinae. It was described by Gory in 1836.

References

Anthiinae (beetle)
Beetles described in 1836